Rahuki railway station 
(Sindhi: راهوڪي ريلوي اسٽيشن) is located in Sindh, Pakistan near the city of Hyderabad.

See also
 List of railway stations in Pakistan
 Pakistan Railways

References

External links

Railway stations in Hyderabad District, Pakistan